, full name Shikimori Hidegoro stable, is a stable of sumo wrestlers, part of the Dewanoumi ichimon or group of stables. It was set up in 1992 by former komusubi Ōshio. The stable did not produce a sekitori until 2012, when his top wrestler Senshō of Mongolia finally won promotion to the jūryō division in the January tournament after eleven years in sumo. The nineteen years and nine months Shikihide stable took to produce a sekitori is the longest by a newly established stable since World War II. Former maegashira Kitazakura took over as Shikihide-oyakata in January 2013 when his predecessor reached 65 years of age. As of January 2023, it had 19 wrestlers (17 listed on the banzuke). It is situated in Ibaraki Prefecture, and along with Tatsunami stable is one of the stables furthest away from sumo's heartland of Ryōgoku.

All members of Shikihide stable have to complete their high school education, and Shikihide has also introduced yoga to his wrestlers after they have finished training for the day. The stable is known for its "open door" policy, allowing anyone who can meet the entry requirements to join regardless of ability. In 2014 a wrestler named Sodachizakari reportedly had to drink several bottles of water to meet the minimum weight requirement. 16 of its 20 wrestlers have yet to make it past the bottom two divisions of jonokuchi and jonidan.

Shikihide-oyakata was in poor health for much of 2020, and his wife in her role as okamisan took an increasing role in running the stable, even overseeing training. Half the stable's wrestlers ran away in early August 2020, complaining about her strict behavior and invasions of their privacy. They were persuaded to return, and although no violence was involved the Sumo Association's compliance committee is continuing to investigate and interview the wrestlers involved.

Ring name conventions
Some wrestlers at this stable take ring names or shikona that end with the character 桜 (read: sakura or zakura), in deference to their coach and the stable's owner, the former Kitazakura. Examples include Wakatozakura, Abezakura, and Shōnanzakura. The last named (previously known as Hattorizakura) has attracted some attention for his persistence in the face of an almost complete lack of success: as of January 2020, Shonanzakura had recorded only three wins in 180 bouts, and once had to be told by the ringside judges to fight properly after he repeatedly tried to lose to an opponent by deliberately falling down without being touched.

Owners
2013-present: 9th Shikimori Hidegorō - abbreviated to Shikihide (toshiyori, former maegashira Kitazakura)
1992-2013: 8th Shikimori Hidegorō (former komusubi Ōshio)

Notable active wrestlers
None

Notable former wrestlers
 (best rank jūryō)
Shōnanzakura (notable for prolonged losing streak)

Referee
Kimura Sakuranosuke (Sandanme gyōji, real name Shōnosuke Kurihara)

Hairdresser
Tokohide (2nd class tokoyama)

Location and access
Ibaraki prefecture, Ryugasaki City, Sanuki 4-17-17
10 minute walk from Sanuki Station on the Jōban Line

See also
List of sumo stables
List of active sumo wrestlers
List of past sumo wrestlers
Glossary of sumo terms

References

External links 
Japan Sumo Association profile

Active sumo stables